Volkswriter is a word processor for the IBM PC written by Camilo Wilson and distributed by Lifetree Software, Inc.

Description
Camilo Wilson was an author and computer consultant who in 1981 planned to use the new IBM PC to write a book about the computer. One of the first to receive it in California, he purchased IBM's EasyWriter word processor—a launch title for the PC—and later said that its "horrors ... were such that I decided to write my own ... to get the book done".  After writing the new application in Pascal in less than four months Wilson borrowed $15,000 to market it, and formed Lifetree Software with his girlfriend. Volkswriter debuted at the spring 1982 West Coast Computer Faire and, as Plainwriter, in a small listing in the first issue of PC Magazine. By the next issue Lifetree described the renamed Volkswriter in a full-page advertisement as "a high performance word processor" with which "you cannot erase data unintentionally".

EasyWriter was so poor in quality that Volkswriter was for a while, as Andrew Fluegelman wrote in late 1982, "the only fully functioning word processor available for the PC". To compete with WordStar, which appeared on the PC six weeks after Volkswriter, Wilson emphasized its ease of use. By early 1984 Lifetree had 40,000 customers, $2 million in sales—about half to companies—27 employees, and released an enhanced $295 Volkswriter Deluxe, also ported to the Atari ST running OS-9 and, as GEM Write, to GEM. The company published versions of the software until May 1989 when due to profitability problems, the Volkswriter product line was sold to employees. The new company formed with the name Volkswriter Inc.

Reception
Fluegelman of PC Magazine wrote that "Like the inspiration for its name, VW doesn't go in for a lot of frills but performs essential functions very well". Although criticizing the lack of headers or footers, he stated "If I needed to have a novice using a word processor within an hour, Volkswriter would be my choice". In a May 1983 review of several IBM PC word processors, BYTE described Volkswriter as "simple in design ... quite straightforward to use for minor writing projects ... just enough features to get most jobs done". It noted Volkswriter's ability to run on a 64K computer and that it had the lowest price, $195, but advised those who primarily used their computers for word processing to consider other options.
 'Volkswriter 3' Is Word-processing Program Not Likely To Be Outgrown, February 2, 1986 Author:Henry Kisor] (AP article, this copy from the Orlando Sentinel)
 Volkswriter 3 review by Paul Schindler of Computer Chronicles, 16 February 1986
 Volkswriter 4. (word processing software) (evaluation)  by Joyce Sides COMPUTE! Issue 134, OCTOBER 1991, PAGE 129
 Volkswriter Scientific: Simple, But Not Quite Complete NEW PRODUCTS by David Chan The Scientist 1987-10-19, 1(23):20.

References

Word processors